Davie County High School (DCHS) is a public high school in Mocksville, North Carolina, United States. Davie County High School is the sole traditional high school in the Davie County School System; it had an enrollment of 1,784 as of the 2013–2014 academic school year.

History 
Davie County High School was built in 1956 on the outskirts of downtown Mocksville, the county seat. Initially the school team name was the Rebels, the school later faced controversy and changed mascots. Davie County High's new team name became the War Eagles.

Since 2000, the county population has expanded 8.2%, and there were ongoing debates that the school might have been too crowded. Two school bond referendums were held, in 2003 and 2007, to provide money for a second new school in the eastern part of the county; however, each of the referendums were rejected by nearly 2-to-1 margins.

In 2014, voters approved the construction of one new high school.
The new high school is located on Farmington Road in north eastern Davie County. It was approved by a 53.76% to 46.24% margin.

Athletics 
Davie County High offers the following sports:
 Baseball
 Basketball
 Cheerleading
 Cross country 
 Golf
 Football
 Lacrosse
 Marching band
 Soccer
 Softball
 Swimming
 Tennis
 Track and field
 Volleyball
 Wrestling

Football
Davie High's 2010 football team were the first football team in the school's history to make it to the North Carolina State Championship. They lost to Durham Hillside by a score of 40–0 during the 4A championship game.

Cheerleading
In 2016, the Davie High School cheerleaders were North Carolina State Champions came in 2nd at Nationals in their division and won the World Championships.

Wrestling
The Davie County wrestling team won the 4A dual team state championship in 1994 and 2006. They won the 4A individual wrestling state tournament championship in 1995. Head Coach Buddy Lowery, who was coach from 1976 to 2019, helped lead Davie's wrestling team to 913-136-2 record as head coach. Lowery was inducted into the Davie County and Salisbury-Rowan Halls of Fame, and the North Carolina Chapter of the National Wrestling Hall of Fame.

Music
In April 2016, the DCHS Wind Ensemble, under the direction of Mr. Andrew Jimeson, competed in and won the President's Cup, a national high school band competition hosted by the United States Army Band. Pieces played include "A Slavic Farewell", "Grant Them Eternal Rest", and "Virginia Scenes", the latter of which was written special for the 2016 Presidents Cup by James Kazik.

In November 2017, the Marching Band and Dancing Boots went to Chicago and marched in the McDonald's Thanksgiving Day Parade.

Notable alumni 
 Andrew C. Brock, member of the North Carolina General Assembly
 Ted Budd, businessman and politician
 Caleb Martin, NBA player
 Cody Martin, NBA player
 Whit Merrifield, MLB player for the Kansas City Royals

References

External links

 Davie County High School website
 Davie High Athletics website

1956 establishments in North Carolina
Educational institutions established in 1956
Public high schools in North Carolina
Schools in Davie County, North Carolina